Șerb is a Romanian-language surname literally meaning "serf". Notable people with the surname include:

Ion Șerb (1926–2004), Romanian general
, Romanian general and politician

See also
Șerban

Romanian-language surnames